Ève Gascon (born May 9, 2003) is a Canadian ice hockey goaltender, currently playing with the Saint-Laurent Patriotes in the  (QCHL) of the  (RSEQ). She is committed to play college ice hockey with the Minnesota Duluth Bulldogs women's ice hockey program in the Western Collegiate Hockey Association (WCHA) conference of the NCAA Division I, beginning in the 2023–24 season.

Playing career 
Throughout her youth, Gascon played exclusively on boys' teams. She initially played as a forward but moved to goal at the suggestion of a coach, who felt she could excel in the position. During 2016 to 2018, she played for the Basses-Laurentides Conquérants in the Quebec bantam AAA league. After posting the best statistics of all goaltenders attending the camp, she was selected to the team and became the first girl to play full-time in the boys' AAA midget league in Québec. 

In the 2019 draft of the Quebec Junior Hockey League (LHJQ or LHJAAAQ), she was selected 13th overall by the Collège Français de Longueuil, the second female player to be drafted into the LHJQ after Ann-Renée Desbiens, who was drafted by the Loups de La Tuque in 2012. Her first appearance with the Collège Français came on February 23, 2020, in a game against the Rangers de Montréal-Est, in which she served as the backup netminder to  Gabriel Waked. She became the third female player to participate in a LHJQ game and the first in nearly two decades, following in the footsteps of Manon Rhéaume, who played with the Jaguars de Louiseville in the 1991–92 season, and Charline Labonté, who donned a Panthères de St-Jérôme sweater during the 2000–01 season.

In August 2020, she was awarded the Isobel Gathorne-Hardy Award, a Hockey Canada honour which recognizes an active player whose values, leadership and personal traits are representative of all female athletes. Later that year, she committed to playing with the Minnesota Duluth Bulldogs women's ice hockey program of the University of Minnesota Duluth in the United States, where she will join a woman's hockey team for the first time in her career. She intends to join the university upon the completion of her studies at the Cégep de Saint-Laurent.

On March 19, 2022, Gascon became the third woman to play in the QMJHL when she started in goal for the Gatineau Olympiques, ultimately losing 5–4 in overtime to the Rimouski Oceanic.

International play 

Gascon was invited to the Canada women's national under-18 ice hockey team training camp in preparation for the 2019 IIHF World Women's U18 Championship, where she was the youngest player in attendance but was ultimately not selected to the final roster. The following year, she earned the starting goaltender role at the 2020 IIHF World Women's U18 Championship, playing in four of five games, including the championship final. Canada fell to rival Team USA in the final and claimed silver in the tournament.

References

External links

2003 births
Living people
Canadian women's ice hockey goaltenders
Ice hockey people from Quebec
People from Terrebonne, Quebec